Daniel Robert Reichert (born July 12, 1976) is a retired professional baseball pitcher. He played in Major League Baseball (MLB) for the Kansas City Royals and Toronto Blue Jays. Reichert pitched at Turlock High School in Turlock, California, and then became a star pitcher for University of the Pacific. He is currently the pitching coach for the Lincoln Saltdogs of the American Association of Professional Baseball.

Career
In , the St. Louis Cardinals drafted Reichert in the 11th round, 306th overall, but he did not sign, choosing to go to play in college at the University of the Pacific. In 1995 and 1996, he played collegiate summer baseball with the Bourne Braves of the Cape Cod Baseball League. In , he was the Big West Conference Pitcher of the Year, a First Team College All-American and a Big West Conference All-Star and was drafted by the Kansas City Royals in the 1st round (7th overall). He signed for a $1.45 million bonus and spent less than three seasons in the minors, where he saw much success before getting the call to the big leagues. In , he was a Triple-A All-Star. On July 16, at the age of 23, he made his major league debut with the Kansas City Royals. He finished his debut season with an ERA of 9.08.

The main criticism against  Reichert had always been his control, or lack thereof. In 1999, Reichert walked 32 and struck out only 20 in just over 36 innings. When Reichert is "on", he can dominate by inducing multiple groundballs. According to one source: "He's got a nice moving fastball that tops out in the low-90s. He likes to work low in the zone and give his infielders some work. [He is a] borderline big-league reliever [because] he tries to be too fancy, [and] it backfires on him, because he doesn't have a lot of fancy pitches to work with after the fastball." In , Reichert led the league with 18 wild pitches in only 153+ innings.

Since then, he has been bouncing around in the Milwaukee Brewers and Seattle Mariners organizations. During the  baseball season, he was pitching for the independent Nashua Pride and the Lincoln Saltdogs.

On May 30, 2008, Reichert signed a minor league contract with the Cleveland Indians and played for the Buffalo Bisons of the International League. On July 10, Reichert was traded to the Pittsburgh Pirates. He became a free agent at the end of the season.

In 2009, he played with the Bridgeport Bluefish.

Reichert served as pitching coach for the Lincoln Saltdogs in 2013–2014 and resumed the role in 2016.

Personal life
In 1998, Reichert was diagnosed with diabetes. He currently resides in Nebraska.

References

External links

1976 births
Living people
Águilas Cibaeñas players
American expatriate baseball players in the Dominican Republic
All-American college baseball players
Altoona Curve players
American expatriate baseball players in Canada
American expatriate baseball players in Taiwan
Atlantic City Surf players
Baseball coaches from California
Baseball players from California
Bourne Braves players
Bridgeport Bluefish players
Buffalo Bisons (minor league) players
Calgary Vipers players
Indianapolis Indians players
Kansas City Royals players
Lansing Lugnuts players
Lincoln Saltdogs players
Major League Baseball pitchers
Minor league baseball coaches
Nashua Pride players
Omaha Golden Spikes players
Omaha Royals players
Pacific Tigers baseball players
People from Turlock, California
Southern Maryland Blue Crabs players
Spokane Indians players
Sportspeople from Monterey, California
Syracuse SkyChiefs players
Tacoma Rainiers players
Toronto Blue Jays players
Wilmington Blue Rocks players
Wichita Wranglers players